Flax or Flaxen is a pale yellowish-gray, the color of straw or unspun dressed flax.  The first recorded use of flax as a color name in English was in 1915, but "flaxen" had been used to describe hair color in David Copperfield, by Charles Dickens in 1849: Mr. Omer's granddaughter, Minnie, is described as "a pretty little girl with long, flaxen, curling hair."

References

See also
List of colors
Flaxen gene